19th Street Oakland station (signed as 19th St/Oakland) is an underground Bay Area Rapid Transit (BART) station located under Broadway between 17th Street and 20th Street in the Uptown District of Oakland, California. It is a timed transfer point between northbound trains to Richmond and to Antioch.

The station has three underground levels, with tracks on the second and third levels.

The station opened in 1972 as part of the first section of BART. In 1980–1986, the KE Track project added the third track to the station. Changes during the 2010s included public art at one entrance, a new canopy at another entrance, and opening of a bike station. A modernization project, which began in 2019, includes new elevators and reopened public restrooms. Tempo bus rapid transit service began in 2020.

Station layout 

The station has three underground levels. The first level is a concourse with ticket machines and faregates. The station has blue brickwork, contrasting with the red of nearby 12th Street Oakland City Center station.

The station has six public entrances: two at 20th Street, two at 19th Street, and two at 17th Street (one in an alley connecting to Telegraph Avenue). A surface elevator is located near 17th Street on the east side of Broadway; the platform elevator is at the south end of the station. There is a direct entrance from the mezzanine level to the 1970 Broadway building, as well as a disused entrance to 1955 Broadway. A 130-space valet parking bike station is located in a storefront at 19th Street, across Broadway from a station entrance.

The elevator to the platforms is outside of the paid area. The paid area will be extended to include the elevator as part of the ongoing renovation project at the station.

History 

The station opened on September 11, 1972, as part of the first section of BART to open; service was extended to Richmond the next year. Service to Concord was added on May 21, 1973, and extended to San Francisco through the Transbay Tube on September 16, 1974. Richmond–San Francisco service was added on April 19, 1976.

The station initially had one side platform on each level, with one track on the east side of each platform. The KE Track project, begun in 1980 and completed on March 17, 1986, converted the upper platform to an island platform with a new west track (Track CX). The new track was originally used for peak hour service (southbound towards San Francisco in the morning, and northbound in the evening).

Schedule changes on June 22, 1992, introduced timed transfers between Richmond–Fremont line and Concord–Daly City line trains; Oakland City Center/12th Street was the transfer point between northbound (Richmond-bound and Concord-bound) trains, while MacArthur station was the transfer point between southbound trains. On September 13, 2010, the northbound transfer location was changed to 19th Street Oakland station.

The Telegraph Avenue entrance was closed from October 14, 2013, to September 30, 2014, for renovations by the City of Oakland. The work included the installation of a kinechromatic sculpture, Shifting Topographies, by Dan Corson. The artwork consists of topographic contour layers of high-density foam coated with a color-shifting paint, which changes hue based on the sun angle and viewing angle. The entrance was closed again from February 3 to March 6, 2015, for the installation of colored glass panels covering vent shafts adjacent to the entrance. Shifting Topographies was damaged by fire on March 8, 2020.

In 2013, BART began design of a prototype glass canopy for the station entrance on the northeast corner of 20th Street and Broadway. The canopy would protect the escalator from weather damage, improve lighting, and allow the escalator to be fully closed off when the station is not open. The BART board voted to construct the canopy in January 2014; it was completed in March 2015 and includes real-time train arrival information screens at street level. The canopy reduced escalator downtime by one-third, prompting the installation of similar canopies at downtown San Francisco stations beginning in 2017.

Construction of the Oakland–San Leandro East Bay Bus Rapid Transit line (later branded Tempo) began in August 2016. Original plans had called for the line to use surface stops on 20th Street at the Uptown Transit Center. However, with the Berkeley leg on Telegraph Avenue cancelled, the stops were instead built on Broadway. Tempo route 1T service began on August 9, 2020.

A bike station in a storefront at 19th Street opened in February 2015. By 2017, the station filled on most weekday mornings; construction of a larger station on BART-owned land at 21st Street was recommended. By August 2020, BART had obtained $1.17 million of the estimated $8–9 million cost of the 400-space bike station.

A 2014 study produced a conceptual design for modernization of the station. A $32.7 million contract for a renovation project was awarded in July 2019. The three separate paid areas will be consolidated, new surface and platform elevators added to the north end of the station, and the 2001-closed public restrooms rebuilt and reopened. Construction began on January 25, 2020. Several entrances were closed from April 13, 2020, to June 12, 2021, due to low ridership during the COVID-19 pandemic. The entrance at the northwest corner of 20th Street and Broadway closed on June 15, 2021, for about six months as part of construction work. The Telegraph Avenue entrance was closed prior to this. The remodeled restrooms opened on February 25, 2022. A ribbon-cutting ceremony for the completed project was held on January 21, 2023.

Uptown Transit Center 

The surface streets around 19th Street Oakland station are a major transfer point for AC Transit buses. The Uptown Transit Center, located on 20th Street west of Broadway, consists of six large shelters built in September 2006 to improve the ease of transfers. A number of routes stop on 20th Street shelters and/or on Broadway at the station:
Broadway Shuttle: Day and Night
Transbay: NL
Rapid: 1T
Local: 6, 12, 18, 33, 51A, 72, 72M
All-Nighter: 1T, 800, 802, 805, 840, 851
Early Bird Express 705

Tempo route 1T service uses dedicated platforms on Broadway. The southbound platform is just south of 20th Street; the northbound (terminating) platform is between 17th Street and 19th Street.

References

External links 

BART – 19th Street Oakland
BART – 19th Street/Oakland Station Modernization

Bay Area Rapid Transit stations in Alameda County, California
Stations on the Orange Line (BART)
Stations on the Yellow Line (BART)
Stations on the Red Line (BART)
Railway stations in Oakland, California
Railway stations in the United States opened in 1972